1-Chlorobutane is an alkyl halide with the chemical formula CH3(CH2)3Cl. It is a colorless, flammable liquid.

Preparation and reactions
It can be prepared from 1-butanol by treatment with hydrogen chloride.

It reacts with lithium metal to give n-butyllithium:
 2 Li + CH3(CH2)3Cl → CH3(CH2)3Li + LiCl

References

Chloroalkanes